The men's high jump event was part of the track and field athletics programme at the 1924 Summer Olympics. The competition was held from Sunday, July 6, 1924, and Monday, July 7, 1924. Twenty-seven high jumpers from 17 nations competed. The maximum number of athletes per nation was 4. The event was won by Harold Osborn of the United States, the nation's seventh consecutive victory in the men's high jump. As in 1920, the Americans went 1–2 in the event, with Leroy Brown earning silver. France took its first high jump medal since 1908 with Pierre Lewden's bronze.

Background

This was the seventh appearance of the event, which is one of 12 athletics events to have been held at every Summer Olympics. The only returning finalist from the 1920 Games was seventh-place finisher Pierre Lewden of France. The heavy favorites in 1924 were Harold Osborn and Leroy Brown of the United States, who "were the dominant jumpers in 1924, with 15 of the best 16 marks on the world lists."

Estonia, Haiti, Ireland, Japan, and South Africa each made their debut in the event. The United States appeared for the seventh time, having competed at each edition of the Olympic men's high jump to that point.

Competition format

The competition used the two-round format introduced in 1912. There were two distinct rounds of jumping with results cleared between rounds. All jumpers clearing 1.83 metres in the qualifying round advanced to the final. There were jump-offs in the final to resolve ties through sixth place.

Records

These were the standing world and Olympic records (in metres) prior to the 1924 Summer Olympics.

At first Harold Osborn set a new Olympic record with 1.95 metres. This height was equaled by Leroy Brown, but finally Harold Osborn again improved the Olympic record with 1.98 metres.

Schedule

Results

Qualifying

The qualification was held on Sunday, July 6, 1924. Jumpers had to pass 1.83 metres to qualify for the final. Nine high jumpers were able to clear this height and qualified for the final. Five competitors were not able to clear any height.

Final

The final was held on Monday, July 7, 1924. The ties for 4th/5th and for 6th/7th were broken by jump-offs. Osborn attempted 2.02 metres (which would have been a world record) but was unsuccessful; he hit the bar with his hand on the second attempt.

References

External links
 Official Report
 

Men's high jump
High jump at the Olympics